Kyethi Township is a township of Loilem District in the Shan State of Burma. The main town is Kesi (Kyethi or Kehsi).

History
Beginning on 6 October 2015 a large scale offensive by the Tatmadaw comprising 20 Burma Army battalions has been launched in central Shan State. The aim of the military is to seize Shan ceasefire territories in Kehsi, Mong Nawng, Mong Hsu and Tangyan townships, using heavy artillery and with fighter jet and helicopter gunship air support to indiscriminately shell and bomb civilian areas. These attacks have displaced thousands of Shan, Palaung, Lisu and Lahu people causing a new humanitarian crisis.

References

Townships of Shan State
Loilen District